Sally Ephraim Keya, commonly known as Sally Boss Madam, (born 13 May 1986), is a Namibian Afro-fusion singer and performer.

She gained fame after the release of her single 'Boss Madam' in the year 2012 which earned her an award at the Namibian Annual Music Awards (NAMAs). She has released several albums 'Courage' 2012 with 16 songs and'I am Mukwanekamba.'
In 2017 she released another album My Black. The album has 15 songs. "My Black is a celebration of black women.

Music career
2015 – Brand Ambassador For Sanlam – Performed at the Women Of Empowerment with The first lady as patron – Performed at the opening of the office of the first lady – Opening act at the BoyzIIMen concert

2014 – CAF Woman Championship Ambassador – CAF Woman championship ambassador - Castle Lite Road Show performer – Opened for the standard Bank Super Cup – Performed at the Bidvest cup – Female Opener for international music performer Davido.

2010 – Performed for the founding father of Namibia at the 20th anniversary of Bank of Namibia – Performed at the old mutual opening of the old mutual tower

Discography

Albums
Courage (2015)
I Am Mukwanekamba (2016)
My Black (2017)

Single
"Bim Bim" ft Bussiwa
"Natural"
"What You Say"
"Fasuluka"

Awards

NAMA AWARDS 

|-
|2011
|Whistler
|Best Single
|
|-
|2013
|Sally Boss Madam
|Best Soukous/ Kwasa
|
|-
|2016
|Sally Boss Madam ft Bussiwa
|Best Single / Bim Bim
|
|-
|2017
|Sally Boss Madam
|Best Single
|
|-
|2017
|Sally Boss Madam
|Song Of The Year
|
|-
|2018
|Sally Boss Madam
|Best Album / My Black
|
|-
|2018
|Sally Boss Madam
|Best Female Artist
|
|-
|2018
|Sally Boss Madam ft KP Illest
|Best Collaboration / I Need You 
|
|-
|2018
|Sally Boss Madam
|Best Music Video / What you say
|
|-
|2018
|Sally Boss Madam
|Best RnB / Ecstacy
|
|-
|2018
|Sally Boss Madam
|Song of the Year / What You Say
|
|-
|2018
|Sally Boss Madam
|Female artist of the year
|
|-
|2020
|Sally Boss Madam
|best Afropop  
|

AFRIMA 

|-
|2016
|Sally Boss Madam
|Best Female Artist Southern Africa
|
|-
|2017
|Sally Boss Madam
|Best Female Artist Southern Africa
|

AFRIMMA 

|-
|2017
|Sally Boss Madam
|Best Female Artist Southern Africa
|

AMI Afrika People's Choice Awards 

|-
|2018
|Sally Boss Madam
|Best Female Southern Artist 
|

References

21st-century Namibian women singers
1986 births
Living people
Musicians from Windhoek